Commander Claude Edward Lutley Sclater DSO and bar, FRGS, MA (b. 24 January 1910, Odiham, Hampshire - d. 20 April 1986), was a British naval officer and, in later life, academic.

Sclater saw much action in World War II, mainly in destroyers, in several notable actions (Dunkirk evacuation and Scharnhorst sinking) and being decorated with the Distinguished Service Order and bar, for his command of the destroyer HMS Wild Swan. After his retirement from the Navy, he was a senior member of the management staff at King's College, Cambridge.

References

 COMMANDER CLAUDE SCLATER DSO and bar, FRGS, MA

People from Odiham
People educated at Twyford School
Graduates of Britannia Royal Naval College
Companions of the Distinguished Service Order
Officers of the Order of the Crown (Belgium)
Fellows of the Royal Geographical Society
1910 births
1986 deaths